The 2014–15 Russian National Football League was the 23rd season of Russia's second-tier football league since the dissolution of the Soviet Union. The season began on 6 July 2014 and ended on 30 May 2015.

Teams

League table

Results

Statistics

Scoring
 First goal of the season: Stanislav Prokofyev for Luch-Energiya against SKA-Energiya Khabarovsk (6 July 2014)

Top goalscorers

References

External links
Official website

2
Russian First League seasons
Rus